Ulrich Mäurer is a German lawyer and politician (SPD). He is Minister for the interior in the Free Hanseatic City of Bremen.

Life 
Mäurer studied law at the University in Marburg and Bremen and reached his degree in 1978. He became Assessor in Bremen Administration and worked later in several positions at the law, corrections and interior departments of the state of Bremen. In November 1987 he became head of the law-education center of Bremen.

Politic
In 1970 Mäurer became a member of German Social Democratic Party (SPD). In 1997 he became state secretary at Senator for law and the constitution. In 2008 he followed Willi Lemke as Minister for Interior and Sport (Senat Böhrnsen II). The office of Ministers in the Free Hanseatic Citys is called Senator.

In 2013 as Senator for the Interior he prohibited the most violent Motorcycle Gangs in Bremen, Hells Angels MC and Mongols MC. Both gangs were deeply involved in organized crime. The Miri-Clan, a large family of Lebanese origin with an estimated 2,600 members, were dominating the Mongols MC, while the Hells Angels had connections to far-right hooligans.

In 2014 he would be known for his initiative to charge German Football Association (DFB) for the regular massive police present at football matches, which was paid until than by public money from taxes. Deutsche Fußball-Liga (DFL) denied this and it went to court.

References

Living people
Politicians from Bremen
Social Democratic Party of Germany politicians
Members of the Bürgerschaft of Bremen
1951 births